Cristian Bertani (born 14 March 1981) is an Italian footballer who plays for Serie D club Milano City as a forward. He was suspended in August 2012 for three years and six months.

Career

Como
Born in Legnano, Lombardy, Bertani started his career with Serie C1 club Como.

Venezia
In 2000, he was sold to Serie B club Venezia in co-ownership deal, for 600 million lire. Bertani made his Serie B debut on 10 September 2000, substituted Arturo Di Napoli in the 68th minute. That match Venezia 2–2 draw with Cittadella by the late goal of Fabian Valtolina. He was loaned to Savoia of Serie C1 in mid-season and to Carrarese of Serie C1 after Venezia promoted to Serie A in 2001.

Bertani returned to Venice in 2002 after the team relegated from Serie A. Due to the club owner Maurizio Zamparini took most of the squad to his new club Palermo, Bertani made 4 league appearances before loaned to Serie C2 for South Tyrol in January 2003. He scored 7 league goals in half season.

Como Return, Varese & Grosseto
In June 2003, Como bought him back which the team recently relegated from Serie A as well as the withdrew of Enrico Preziosi. He failed to play regularly with Como, just played twice. In January 2004, Bertani returned to Serie C1 again, this time for Varese. After the team went bankrupt, he was signed by Grosseto, his 4th Serie C1 club.

Ivrea
In August 2005 he left for Serie C2 side Ivrea. He followed the team promoted to Serie C1 in 2006 and relegated back to Serie C2 in 2007. In his last season with the Piedmont club, he scored a career high of 23 goals in Serie C2.

Novara
In June 2008 he was signed by Novara He won Lega Pro Prima Divisione in 2010 and promoted to Serie B. Partnered with Simone Motta, they netted 26 goals for the team that season.

In 2010–11 Serie B season, he scored 17 goals in 35 matches.

Sampdoria
In July 2011 he was signed by Sampdoria. He was released before the end of the season due to his involvement in the 2011–2012 Italian football scandal, that led to him being arrested on 28 May 2012.

Honours
 Lega Pro Prima Divisione: 2010

References

External links
 La Gazzetta dello Sport Profile 
 Football.it Profile 
 

1981 births
Living people
People from Legnano
Italian footballers
Serie B players
Serie C players
Serie D players
Como 1907 players
Venezia F.C. players
A.C. Savoia 1908 players
Carrarese Calcio players
F.C. Südtirol players
S.S.D. Varese Calcio players
F.C. Grosseto S.S.D. players
A.S.D. Calcio Ivrea players
Novara F.C. players
U.C. Sampdoria players
A.C. Gozzano players
Calcio Lecco 1912 players
S.S.D. Pro Sesto players
U.S. 1913 Seregno Calcio players
Association football forwards
Milano City F.C. players
Footballers from Lombardy
Sportspeople from the Metropolitan City of Milan